Nindaroo is a rural locality in the Mackay Region, Queensland, Australia. In the  Nindaroo had a population of 239 people.

History 
Nindaroo Provisional School opened on 27 February 1899. On 1 January 1909 it became Nindaroo State School, before closing in 1963. The school was located at 1 Boveys Road, corner of Mackay Habana Road, now in neighbouring Richmond.

In the  Nindaroo had a population of 239 people.

References

External links

Mackay Region
Localities in Queensland